HMS Centurion was a 80-gun second rate  ship of the line built for the Royal Navy in the 1840s.

Description
The Vanguard class was designed by Sir William Symonds, Surveyor of the Navy, with each ship built with a slightly different hull shape to evaluate their speed and handling characteristics. The ship's tonnage was 2,589  tons burthen. The Vanguards had a wartime crew of 720 officers and ratings.
 
The Vanguard class ships of the line were armed with twenty 32-pounder (56 cwt) cannon and two 68-pounder carronades on her lower gundeck, twenty-eight 32-pounder (50 cwt) cannon and another pair of 68-pounder carronades on the upper gundeck. On her quarterdeck were fourteen 32-pounder (42 cwt) cannon and on the forecastle deck were eight more 32-pounder (42 cwt) cannon.

Modifications
When Centurion was ordered to be modified for steam propulsion in 1854, she was fitted with a two-cylinder horizontal steam engine of 400 nominal horsepower that drove a single propeller shaft.

Construction and career

Centurion was ordered from Pembroke Dockyard on 18 March 1839 and laid down the following July. She was launched on 2 May 1844 and completed on 10 June. The ship was not fitted out and Centurion was placed in ordinary. Her construction cost £57,386. Between September 1854 and November 1855, she was fitted with steam propulsion.

Centurion was sold for scrap on 19 March 1870, for a price of £8200.

Notes

Citations

References
 Lavery, Brian (2003) The Ship of the Line - Volume 1: The Development of the Battlefleet 1650-1850. Conway Maritime Press. .
 
 
 

 

Ships of the line of the Royal Navy
Vanguard-class ships of the line
Ships built in Pembroke Dock
1844 ships